The Clerk of the Pipe was a post in the Pipe Office of the English Exchequer and its successors. The incumbent was responsible for the pipe rolls on which the government income and expenditure was recorded as credits and debits.

The Dialogus de Scaccario or Dialogue concerning the Exchequer, written in about 1178, details the workings of the Exchequer and gives an early account of how the Pipe rolls were created. The Dialogue was written by Richard FitzNeal, the son of Nigel of Ely, who was Treasurer for both Henry I and Henry II of England. According to the Dialogue, the Pipe rolls were the responsibility of the clerk of the Treasurer, who was also called the ingrosser of the great roll and, by 1547 at the latest, the Clerk of the Pipe.

The Pipe Office was abolished in 1834.

A similar post existed in Ireland and Scotland.

Clerks of the Pipe
 1431–: Robert Cawood 
 Robert Malton
 1486–: Nicholas Lathell
 15nn–: Thomas Cavendish (died 1524)
 1520s–1545: John Hyde 
 1551–?1589: Christopher Smith
 1579–: John Morley (died 1587)
 1579–?1592: Thomas Moryson (died 1592)
 1592–1594: Sir John Wolley (died 1596) 
 1596–1605: Sir Edward Stafford
 1607–?1609: Francis Wolley (died 1609) 
 1609–1610: Arthur Jarvis
 1610–1616: Sir Arthur Mainwaring
 1616–1632: Henry Croke (jointly)
 1616–1632: Anthony Rous (jointly) (died 1632)
 1632–1659: Henry Croke
 1659–1680: Robert Croke (died 1680)
 1689–1703: Hon. Robert Russell
 1703–1706: William Cheyne, 2nd Viscount Newhaven
 1706–1710: Sir John Cooke
 1710–1711: William Farrer
 1711–1728: William Cheyne, 2nd Viscount Newhaven
 1728–1728: Anthony Cornish
 1728–1748: Henry Holt Henley
 1748–1748: Sir William Corbet, Bt
 1748–1758: Richard Arundell
 1758–1783: Sir John Shelley, 5th Baronet
 1783–?1834 Lord William Bentinck  
 1834 Post abolished

References

Economic history of England
Exchequer offices